The 2014 Girl's Africa Volleyball Championship happens in Egypt, from 7 to 9 September. The winner qualifies for the 2015 FIVB Girls Youth World Championship.

Venue
 Hacene Harcha Hall, Algiers, Algeria

Final round

Classification

Schedule and results

Awards

Most Valuable Player
 Nada Meawad
Best Outside Spikers
 Nada Meawad
Best Setter
 Reem El Mohand
Best Receiver
 Kahina Bouncer
Best Server
 Bakhta Mazari
Best Middle Blockers
 Nour Bensalem
Best Libero
 Samar Saafi

External links
Championnat d'Afrique des Nations U23 U18 Dames - Results - afvb.org
http://www.goalzz.com/main.aspx?c=10975&stage=1&sch=true goalzz.com

2014 in volleyball